Kyrgyz Air was a privately owned airline based in Kyrgyzstan. The president of the company was Bill Pellew-Harvey, a British citizen (in 2003). The airline was started in 2002 and ceased operations in 2003.

Services
Scheduled services operated included:

Bishkek to Beijing, Delhi, Dubai, Istanbul, Moscow and Ürümqi

Fleet
The airline only operated one McDonnell Douglas MD-82 aircraft. Two were ordered, but only one was delivered and used.

References

Defunct airlines of Kyrgyzstan
Airlines established in 2002
Airlines disestablished in 2003
2002 establishments in Kyrgyzstan